Jone Kubu (born Naitasiri, circa 1961) is a Fijian former rugby union footballer, he played as a fullback. His nephew is Marika Kubu, who plays for Sila Central High School.

Career
He was capped for Fiji in 1985, during a match against Wales, at Cardiff, on 9 November. He was also part of the 1987 Rugby World Cup Fijian squad, playing three matches in the tournament. His last international cap was against England, in Suva, on 16 June 1988. After the 1987 Rugby World Cup, Kubu was recruited for the Australian club Eastern Suburbs RUFC, where he played for 13 years.

References

External links

1958 births
Fijian rugby union players
Fijian expatriates in Australia
Rugby union fullbacks
Living people
People from Naitasiri Province
I-Taukei Fijian people
Fiji international rugby union players